Variovorax dokdonensis is a Gram-negative, motile bacterium from the genus  Variovorax, which was isolated from soil in Dokdo in Korea. Colonies of V. dokdonensis are yellow in color.

References

External links
Type strain of Variovorax dokdonensis at BacDive -  the Bacterial Diversity Metadatabase

Comamonadaceae
Bacteria described in 2006